is a 1955 black-and-white Japanese film drama directed by Eisuke Takizawa.

The film won 1956 Blue Ribbon Awards for best screenplay by Ryūzō Kikushima.

Cast 
 Shōgo Shimada
 Osamu Takizawa
 Isao Yamagata
 Kunitaro Sawamura

References

External links 
 

Japanese drama films
Japanese black-and-white films
1955 films
Films directed by Eisuke Takizawa
Nikkatsu films
Films scored by Masaru Sato
1955 drama films
1950s Japanese films